Louis Welles Shapiro (born 1941) is an American mathematician working in the fields of combinatorics and finite group theory. He is an emeritus professor at Howard University.

Shapiro attended Harvard University for his undergraduate studies and then the University of Maryland, College Park for graduate school. Shapiro is most known for creating the Riordan array, named after mathematician John Riordan, and developing the theory around it.  He has been an organizer of and speaker at the yearly International Conference on Riordan Arrays and Related Topics, which has been held annually beginning 2014.

References 

1941 births
Living people
20th-century American mathematicians
21st-century American mathematicians
Howard University faculty
Harvard University alumni
University of Maryland, College Park alumni